The New Eve (Latin: Nova Eva) is a devotional title for Mary mother of Jesus. It is perhaps the most ancient doctrinal title given to Mary in the Early Church. Since the apostolic age, both Eastern and Western Church fathers have expressed this doctrinal idea, which had been a universal teaching of the Early Church. Mary's unique and necessary participation in the economy of salvation is expressed in the doctrine, particularly her faith at the annunciation of Gabriel, which facilitates the incarnation of Christ and human redemption.

Early Church Fathers
The Forefathers of the Early Church looked to Paul's Letter of the Galatians 4:4-5: "But when the fullness of time had come, God sent his Son, born of a woman, born under the law, to ransom those under the law, so that we might receive adoption", and related this to the woman spoken of in the Protevangelium of : "I will put enmity between you and the woman, and between your offspring and hers; They will strike at your head, while you strike at their heel." Irenaeus of Lyons in his Against Heresies (5.21.1), followed by several other Fathers of the Church, interpreted the verse as a reference to Christ.

Justin Martyr was among the first to draw a parallel between Eve and Mary. This derives from his comparison of Adam and Jesus. In his Dialogue with Trypho, written sometime between 155-167, he explains:He became man by the Virgin, in order that the disobedience which proceeded from the serpent might receive its destruction in the same manner in which it derived its origin. For Eve, who was a virgin and undefiled, having conceived the word of the serpent, brought forth disobedience and death. But the Virgin Mary received faith and joy, when the angel Gabriel announced the good tidings to her that the Spirit of the Lord would come upon her, and the power of the Highest would overshadow her: wherefore also the Holy Thing begotten of her is the Son of God; and she replied, 'Be it unto me according to thy word." And by her has He been born, to whom we have proved so many scriptures refer, and by whom God destroys both the serpent and those angels and men who are like him; but works deliverance from death to those who repent of their wickedness and believe upon Him.

Ireneaus, bishop of Lugdunum, also takes this up in Against Heresies, written about the year 182:In accordance with this design, Mary the Virgin is found obedient, saying: “Behold the handmaid of the Lord; be it unto me according to your word.” Luke 1:38 But Eve was disobedient, for she did not obey when as yet she was a virgin. ... having become disobedient, was made the cause of death, both to herself and to the entire human race; so also did Mary, having a man betrothed [to her], and being nevertheless a virgin, by yielding obedience, become the cause of salvation, both to herself and the whole human race. And on this account does the law term a woman betrothed to a man, the wife of him who had betrothed her, although she was as yet a virgin; thus indicating the back-reference from Mary to Eve,...For the Lord, having been born “the First-begotten of the dead,” Revelation 1:5 and receiving into His bosom the ancient fathers, has regenerated them into the life of God, He having been made Himself the beginning of those that live, as Adam became the beginning of those who die. 1 Corinthians 15:20-22 Wherefore also Luke, commencing the genealogy with the Lord, carried it back to Adam, indicating that it was He who regenerated them into the Gospel of life, and not they Him. And thus also it was that the knot of Eve's disobedience was loosed by the obedience of Mary. For what the virgin Eve had bound fast through unbelief, this did the virgin Mary set free through faith.

Medieval period
The early Medieval period reflected an increased devotion to Mary after the Council of Ephesus which declared Mary Theotokos, which in the West was rendered "Mother of God". The rise of monasticism preserved the works of the Early Fathers. According to Luigi Gambero, sermons tended to follow a standard form: "...the sin of our first parents, the Eve-Mary parallel, the angel's Annunciation to Mary and the Incarnation of the Son of God, the birth of Christ..."

Modern
In the 1854 apostolic constitution, Ineffabilis Deus, promulgating the dogma of the Immaculate Conception, Pope Pius IX referred to the opinion of the Fathers:Hence, to demonstrate the original innocence and sanctity of the Mother of God, not only did they frequently compare her to Eve while yet a virgin, while yet innocence, while yet incorrupt, while not yet deceived by the deadly snares of the most treacherous serpent; but they have also exalted her above Eve with a wonderful variety of expressions. Eve listened to the serpent with lamentable consequences; she fell from original innocence and became his slave. The most Blessed Virgin, on the contrary, ever increased her original gift, and not only never lent an ear to the serpent, but by divinely given power she utterly destroyed the force and dominion of the evil one.

In the 1974 Apostolic Exhortation Marialis Cultus, Pope Paul VI saw Mary as the second Eve standing alongside and subordinated to Christ, the second Adam. As the second Eve, she is the new woman, the definitive expression of what it is to be human. In Mary we see what God intends for his people as a whole. "She is given to us as a pledge and guarantee that God's plan in Christ has already been realized in a creature."

The Roman Breviary contains a Mass in which Mary is described, "Mary, the New Eve, is the First Disciple of the New Law."

She appears in this way as the Co-Redemptrix, “with the Redeemer.” Within Church teaching lies the doctrine of Mary as Co-Redemptrix, as she who was the instrument with which mankind was redeemed. Drawing upon the Old Testament the Church finds Eve to be co-peccatrix, “with the Sinner,” because it was Eve who freely gave the “instrument” of the Fall. It is Eve who gave the “forbidden fruit” to Adam, the Peccator, “the Sinner,” whose sin as father of the human race led to the loss of grace for the human race.   This makes Mary Co-Redemptrix because she freely gave the instrument of the Redemption in her Fiat, in giving her body to bear Jesus Christ, our Redeemer. St. Ephraem called Mary “the price of the redemption of captives,” and it is in this way that the Church looks to her as “Mother of the Living.” Through her obedience and faith, Mary became the New Eve as the Co-Redemptrix. (St. Thomas Aquinas, Summa Theologica)

Further Quotes and Poetry on the Nova Eva: “A virgin, a bit of wood, and now death symbolize our defeat. See now how these three things have become for us a principle of life. For Eve there is Mary; for the tree of the knowledge of good and evil there is the wood of the Cross; for the death of Adam there is the death of Christ. Do you see the demon prostrated by the very weapons which had rendered him victorious?”

Amphilochius of Iconium, On Christmas "...O Mary, O Mary, the Maker of all things was your firstborn Son! O humanity, who became the bodily substance of the Word and for that reason became more honorable than the spiritual virtues of heaven! 
For Christ did not want to clothe himself in the form of archangels or in the form of the immaterial figures of the principalities, virtues, and powers; rather, through you, he clothed himself in your form, which had fallen and become like that of the brute animals. 
...but where now is that hostile and bewildered dragon? Where is that cursed and execrable dragon, who had claimed that this throne would be raised to the heights of heaven?"

Caelius Sedulius (d. ca. 440-450) Because of one man, all his descendants perished; And all are saved because of one man. Because of one woman, the deadly door opened; And life returned, because of one woman.

References 

  St. Epiphanius, Our Lady
  St. Cyril, Our Lady
  St. Irenaeus
  Mariology v. II
  St. Thomas Aquinas, Summa Theologica, Mary: Co-Redemptrix, Mediatrix, Advocate
  Our Lady
 Gambero, Luigi. Mary and the Fathers of the Church: The Blessed Virgin Mary in Patristic Thought, trans. Thomas Buffer (San Francisco: Ignatius Press, 1999).

Titles of Mary

Religious concepts related with Adam and Eve